Bilhaur Dehat is a village and Gram panchayat in Bilhaur Tehsil, Kanpur Nagar district, Uttar Pradesh, India. Its village code is 149954. According to 2011 Census of India the total population of the village is 6,100 in which 3,189 is males and 2,911 are females.

References

Villages in Kanpur Nagar district